Bilateral and diplomatic relations exist between these two countries. Bahrain does not have an embassy in Spain, it relates its diplomatic activities in this country through its embassy in Paris. Spain also has no embassy in Bahrain, but its embassy in Kuwait is accredited to this country, Spain has an Honorary Consulate in Manama (Bahrain).

Diplomatic relations 
Relations between both countries are based on the good relationship between royal families and in this context there have been several private visits. Relations are normally channeled through the embassies of Spain in Kuwait and Bahrain in Paris.

Economic relations 
In 2014, Spanish exports to Bahrain were 130.3 million euros, with an increase of 32.8%, showing an increase in the residual of various merchandise, in clothing, leather goods, tiles, furniture and vegetables fresh. Imports from Bahrain were 51.8 million euros, with a fall of 12.2 percent, due to lower imports of semi-finished aluminum products and air navigation equipment. The coverage was 251.09 when a year earlier it was 167.7 percent.

Bahrain is ranked 92 among customers in Spain and 109 as a supplier. The export from Spain to Bahrain is very diversified, especially in consumer goods. Highlights include women's clothing, fuels and lubricants, ceramic floor and wall tiles and men's clothing, as well as the defense industry and public order equipment.

Agreements 
In May 2008, an Agreement for the Promotion and Reciprocal Protection of Investments was signed. It entered into force: February 17, 2014. In May 2014, an Agreement on Cooperation in the field of defense was signed. On June 30, 2013, the MoU on bilateral consultations between the MAEC of Spain and the MAE of Bahrain was signed. On May 1, 2014, a MoU was signed in the tourism field between the Ministry of Industry, Energy and Tourism of the Kingdom of Spain and the Ministry of Culture of the Kingdom of Bahrain.

See also 
 Foreign relations of Bahrain    
 Foreign relations of Spain

References 

 
Spain
Bahrain